Van Loon is a Dutch language toponymic surname. "Loon", an Old Dutch dative plural of "Lo" meaning "near/in the woods", is (part of) the name of multiple towns (e.g. Borgloon and Loon op Zand) and two medieval counties in the Low Countries.
Notable people with the surname include:

, Dutch noble family
Agnes van Loon (1150–1191), duchess consort of Bavaria
Annewies van Loon (1793-1877), Dutch art collector better known as Annewies van Winter
Antonius van Loon (1888–1962), Dutch tug of war competitor
Borin Van Loon (born 1976), British illustrator
Emmo van Loon (died 1078 AD), count of the County of Loon
Gerardus van Loon, an alternate name for Olympic sport shooter Dirk Boest Gips
Giselbert van Loon (c. 980 – c. 1045), count of the County of Loon
Hendrik Willem van Loon (1882–1944), Dutch-American historian and journalist
 Van Loon's Lives, his 1942 book
Johan van Loon (born 1934), Dutch ceramist and textile artist
Jordy van Loon (born 1993), Dutch child singer
Julienne van Loon (born 1970), Australian writer
Larry Van Loon, member of The Shaun Murphy Band
Lawrence Gwyn van Loon (1903-1985), American general practitioner, historical linguist and forger
Louise Van Loon (1905-1987), American wife of Reginald Sheffield
Maria van Loon-Heinsberg (1424–1502), countess consort
Martine van Loon (born 1972), Dutch singer
Peeter van Loon (ca. 1600–1660), Flemish painter
Patrick van Loon (born 1974), Dutch judoka
Paul van Loon (born 1955), Dutch children's author and singer
Richard J. Van Loon (born 1940), Canadian academic and civil servant
Theodoor van Loon (1581 or 1582–1649), Flemish Baroque painter
Ton van Loon (born 1956), Dutch general
Willem van Loon (1891–1975), Dutch tug of war competitor

See also
Albertus Van Loon House, historic building in Athens, New York
Atlas Van Loon, a 17th-century 18-volume atlas by Frederik Willem van Loon
Dirk Van Loon House, historic home in Pella, Iowa
Jan Van Loon House, historic building in Athens, New York
Museum Van Loon, museum in Amsterdam, Netherlands
Slag Boom Van Loon, musical act and eponymous album featuring Mike Paradinas
Van Loan, an altered spelling to preserve the original pronunciation in English
Van Loon Glacier, glacier in Antarctica
Van Loon Wildlife Area, La Crosse County, Wisconsin 
Bridge No. 4 (Van Loon Wildlife Area), a bridge on the U.S. National Register of Historic Places
Van Loon's Law, an aphorism attributed to Hendrik Willem van Loon

References

Dutch-language surnames
Surnames of Dutch origin